Fred Pearce (born 30 December 1951) is an English science writer and public speaker based in London. He reports on the environment, popular science and development issues. He specialises in global environmental issues, including water and climate change.

Biography 
Pearce is currently the environment consultant of New Scientist magazine and a regular contributor to the British newspapers Daily Telegraph, The Guardian, The Independent, and Times Higher Education.  He has also written for several US publications including Audubon, Foreign Policy, Popular Science, Seed, and Time.

Pearce has written books on environmental issues and development issues. He has also written reports and extended journalism for WWF, the UN Environment Programme, the Red Cross, UNESCO, the World Bank, the European Environment Agency, and the UK Environment Agency.  He is a trustee of the Integrated Water Resources International.

Writings 
 
 
 

 Climate tipping points loom large
 
 The Coming Population Crash: and Our Planet's Surprising Future , Beacon Press, 2010. 
 The Climate Files: The Battle for the Truth About Global Warming, Guardian Books, 2010. 
 Written in Water: Messages of Hope for Earth's Most Precious Resource (contributing essayist), National Geographic Society, 2010. 

 The Land Grabbers: The New Fight over Who Owns the Earth, Beacon Press, 2012

References

External links 
Fred's Footprint blog on New Scientist website (defunct)

1951 births
Living people
English environmentalists
English male journalists
English science writers